{{DISPLAYTITLE:C24H40O5}}
The molecular formula C24H40O5 (molar mass: 408.57 g/mol) may refer to:

 Cholic acid
 Hyocholic acid, or 3α,6α,7α-trihydroxy-5β-cholan-24-oic acid
 Muricholic acids

Molecular formulas